Chanin is a surname. Notable people with the surname include:

Alabama Chanin, American fashion designer
Irwin Chanin (1891–1988), American architect
Jack Chanin (1907–1997), US-based Ukrainian magician
Jim Chanin (born 1947), American attorney
Marie-Lise Chanin (born 1934), French geophysicist and aeronomist
Gavin Chanin (born 1986), California winemaker and artist